The 2019 Netball New Zealand Super Club was the third edition of the invitational club-based netball tournament organised by Netball New Zealand. With a team coached by Rob Wright, captained by Geva Mentor and featuring Natalie Medhurst, Ashleigh Brazill and Shimona Nelson, Collingwood Magpies finished the 2019 tournament as winners after defeating Northern Mystics 49–42 in the final. The staging of the 2019 tournament was delayed because of the 2019 Netball World Cup. This effectively made it a pre-season tournament for the teams involved. All the matches were hosted at the Trafalgar Centre in Nelson between 8 December and 13 December 2019 and were broadcast live on Sky Sport (New Zealand).

Teams
The tournament featured eight teams. These included all six ANZ Premiership teams plus Collingwood Magpies from Suncorp Super Netball and Wasps Netball from the Netball Superleague.

Group A

Matches
Day 1

Day 2

Day 3

Final ladder

Group B

Matches
Day 1

Day 2

Day 3

Final ladder

5th/8th place classification

Semi-finals

7th/8th place match

5th/6th place match

1st/4th Play offs

Semi-finals

Third place play-off

Final

Rankings

References

2018
2019 in New Zealand netball
2019 in Australian netball
2019 in English netball
December 2019 sports events in New Zealand